Izozog Airport  is an airstrip  northeast of Cabezas in the Santa Cruz Department of Bolivia.

Google Earth Historical Imagery (August 2016) shows the runway overgrown with brush and trees.

See also

Transport in Bolivia
List of airports in Bolivia

References

External links 
OpenStreetMap - Izozog
OurAirports - Izozog

Airports in Santa Cruz Department (Bolivia)